Son of Mine is a 2015 Dutch crime film directed by Remy van Heugten. The film won 4 Golden Calves: Best Feature Film, Best Director, Best Screenplay and Best Cinematography.

Plot 
Lei, descendant of an unemployed coal miner, is an aimless man in his fifties, living a hand to mouth existence. When Lei's son Jeffrey discovers that Lei has a long-drawn debt with Vester, a charismatic crime boss, he does what every loving son would do: He reckons his father's problems as his own.

Cast 
 Johan Leysen as Vester
  as Walt
 Vincent van der Valk as Jeffrey Frissen
  as Lei Frissen

References

External links 

2015 crime films
Dutch crime films